EaseUS Data Recovery Wizard is proprietary data recovery software that aims to recover deleted files from a partition on a digital storage device such as a hard disk or solid state drive, recover deleted or formatted partitions and corrupted data. Users interact with the software using a wizard-style graphical user interface. The software is available for free but additional features such as recovering from a Windows preinstallation environment requires a paid license. The software is used for data recovery.

Features 
There are free and paid versions of the software on both Windows and macOS.

Technical details
On most filesystems, file deletion typically does not erase the data itself but simply flags the file as having been deleted, and marks the physical space the file took up on the hard drive as empty, allowing other files to overwrite the deleted file. Consequently, file recovery software like EaseUS can, under some circumstances, recover deleted files from unallocated drive space. For example, Al-Sabaawi et. al. (2019) showed that EaseUS can carve files from the LOST.DIR on an Android operating system. This is, in part, because the files' data resides on the drive as fragments.

EaseUS scans drives for deleted files in two different ways: (1) file directory and (2) storage content. The file directory method retrieves information about the deleted file from the filesystem. Typically, NTFS keeps a record of files, even those that have been deleted and this information is used to recover a (deleted) file. The storage content method performs file carving to look for patterns in unallocated sectors in the hope that a continuous run of sectors will match a pattern. The latter method can recover files but it does not recover the file system metadata associated with the file, such as the file name, modification date or directory structure. More importantly, the second method is less effective if the files on the drive were fragmented prior to deletion or are simply plaintext.

EaseUS recovery of formatted partitions uses a different method from above. Instead of using file carving, the software reads from the backup volume boot record to obtain the lost partition information. A successful restore of the formatted partition also restores the associated metadata and file directory structure. Partition recovery is not certain. For example, an experiment by Nordvik et. al. (2020) did not successfully recover an ext4 partition that was reformatted with the NTFS filesystem, but they were able to recover an NTFS partition reformatted with the ext4 filesystem.

See also 

 TestDisk
 EaseUS Partition Master

References 

Data recovery software
2005 software
Internet in China
2005 establishments in China